{{Infobox character
| color       = #FFC569
| info-hdr    = Personal Information
| image       = 
| caption     = 
| weapon      = 
| affiliation = 
| spouse      = Marisha
| family      =  Parents Siblings| children    =  Children15 Children, including:
| relatives   = Cousins}}Shurasena'''  is a Yadava ruler of Mathura featured in Hindu mythology. He was married to a nāga (or serpent) woman named Marisha. She bore all of his children and was the cause for Vasuki’s boon to Bhima. He is stated to be the king after whom the Surasena Kingdom and the Yadava sect of Surasenas  were named.

Shurasena or Shoorsaini was the father of Samudravijaya (himself father of Neminatha), Vasudeva (himself father of Vāsudeva-Krishna) and Kunti (mother of Karna and the Pandavas) He is extensively mentioned in both the Mahabharata and the Puranas as the father of Vasudeva (father of Krishna) and Kunti.

References

Characters in the Mahabharata
People related to Krishna